County Hall is a municipal building in Wynnstay Road, Ruthin, Denbighshire, Wales. The structure is the headquarters of Denbighshire County Council.

History 

The first public building in the town was the old court house in St Peter's Square which, in its current incarnation, dated back to 1421. It was succeeded by the old county hall in Record Street, which was designed by Joseph Turner as a record office for the Court of Great Sessions in Wales and completed in 1790. It was enhanced by the addition of a tetrastyle portico with Doric order columns supporting a modillioned pediment in 1866. The building also served in a judicial capacity as the venue for the courts of assize, with the justices meeting there on a regular basis. Following the implementation of the Local Government Act 1888, which established county councils in every county, Denbighshire County Council set up its headquarters in the building. However, by the early 20th century, the county leaders considered the building to be too small and decided to commission a more substantial structure.

The new building was designed by Walter Douglas Wiles in the neoclassical style, built in a combination of Eyarth stone and Runcorn stone and was completed in March 1909. The design involved a symmetrical main frontage on the corner of Market Street and Wynnstay Road. The corner bay featured a round headed doorway with a fanlight and voussoirs on the ground floor and a carved panel above; there were three small windows on the first floor separated by colonnettes; the bay was flanked by full-height Ionic order columns supporting a modillioned segmental pediment. The Market Street and Wynnstay Road elevations were decorated in a similar style with slightly projecting bays which featured tri-partite windows on the ground floor, windows separated by colonettes on the first floor and full-height pilasters supporting triangular pediments. Internally, the principal rooms were the council chamber and the offices for the county officers.

Following local government reorganisation in 1974, the building became the offices of Glyndŵr District Council and, following the creation of unitary authorities in 1996, it became the offices of the new Denbighshire County Council.

Most of the building was demolished in 2002, but retaining the main facades to Wynnstay Road and Market Street. A large modern building was then built behind the facade, with the works being procured under a private finance initiative contract. The works were undertaken by Ion Developments at a cost of £20 million and was completed in May 2004. In November 2015, the county council bought the developer out of its 25-year contract at a cost to the council of £17 million.

Notes

References 

Ruthin
Government buildings completed in 1909
Ruthin